Peter Šinglár (born 24 July 1979) is a former Slovak football defender who currently plays for the Slovak lower division club ŠK Záhradné.

Honours

Slovan Liberec
Gambrinus liga: 2005–06

Wisła Kraków
Ekstraklasa: 2008–09

Statistics 
 (correct as of 18 February 2011)

External links
MFK Košice profile

1979 births
Living people
Sportspeople from Prešov
Slovak footballers
Slovakia international footballers
Slovak expatriate footballers
Association football defenders
1. FC Tatran Prešov players
FC Steel Trans Ličartovce players
FK Dubnica players
FC Slovan Liberec players
Wisła Kraków players
FC VSS Košice players
Slovak Super Liga players
Ekstraklasa players
Expatriate footballers in the Czech Republic
Expatriate footballers in Poland
Slovak expatriate sportspeople in the Czech Republic
Slovak expatriate sportspeople in Poland